Waitman T. Willey House is a historic home located at Morgantown, Monongalia County, West Virginia. It was built in 1839–1840, and is a -story, "L"-shaped brick residence in the Classical Revival style. The front facade features a one-story pentastyle portico with five fluted wood Doric order columns and a high pitched triangular pediment.  It was built for Waitman T. Willey (1811-1900), noted lawyer, orator, and statesman.

It was listed on the National Register of Historic Places in 1982.

References

Houses on the National Register of Historic Places in West Virginia
Neoclassical architecture in West Virginia
Houses completed in 1840
Houses in Morgantown, West Virginia
National Register of Historic Places in Monongalia County, West Virginia